The 2013–14 FC Krylia Sovetov Samara season was the 20th, and final, successive season that Krylia Sovetov played in the Russian Premier League, the highest tier of football in Russia. They finished the season in 14th place, going into a Relegation Play-off against FC Torpedo Moscow which they lost 0-2 on aggregate. They also reached the Fifth Round of the Russian Cup, going out on penalties to FC Sokol Saratov.

Squad

Transfers

Summer

In:

Out:

Winter

In:

Out:

Competitions

Russian Premier League

Matches

League table

Relegation play-offs

Russian Cup

Squad statistics

Appearances and goals

|-
|colspan="14"|Players away from Krylia Sovetov on loan:
|-
|colspan="14"|Players who appeared for Krylia Sovetov that left during the seasonno longer at the club:

|}

Top scorers

Disciplinary record

Notes

References

PFC Krylia Sovetov Samara seasons
Rostov